Modern Artillery (stylized as MODERN ARTillery) is the third studio album by Australian punk rock band the Living End, released on 28 October 2003 internationally and on 2 March 2004 in the United States. It is the first album to feature drummer Andy Strachan, since Travis Demsey had left the band after their second album, Roll On.

The song "Who's Gonna Save Us?" was released as a single and appeared in commercials for the documentary film Fahrenheit 9/11. "End of the World" is featured on the soundtrack for the video game Tony Hawk's Underground 2.

ARIA publicised that the album had officially achieved platinum status in Australia in November 2007.

Track listing

In the vinyl releases of the album, the tracks "One Said to the Other" and "Tabloid Magazine" are swapped.

Bonus DVD
Released as a limited edition bonus DVD with the Australian version of the album, it includes six live tracks from Splendour in the Grass 2003, as well as backstage footage. All tracks were recorded live at Splendour in the Grass, Byron Bay, Australia.

"Roll On"
"Save the Day"
"Carry Me Home"
"West End Riot"
"E-Boogie"
"Second Solution"

Singles
"One Said to the Other" (2003) – #19 Australia, Triple J Hottest 100, 2002 #52
"Who's Gonna Save Us?" (2003) – #37 Australia, Triple J Hottest 100, 2003 #23
"Tabloid Magazine" (2003) – Triple J Hottest 100, 2003 #66

Personnel
Chris Cheney – vocals, guitar
Scott Owen – double bass, vocals
Andy Strachan – drums

Charts

Weekly charts

Certifications

References

2003 albums
2004 albums
The Living End albums
EMI Records albums
Reprise Records albums
Albums produced by Mark Trombino